Nancy Ann Lynch (born January 19, 1948) is a mathematician, a theorist, and a professor at the Massachusetts Institute of Technology. She is the NEC Professor of Software Science and Engineering in the EECS department and heads the "Theory of Distributed Systems" research group at MIT's Computer Science and Artificial Intelligence Laboratory.

Education and early life
Lynch was born in Brooklyn, and her academic training was in mathematics. She attended Brooklyn College and MIT, where she received her Ph.D. in 1972 under the supervision of Albert R. Meyer.

Work
She served on the math and computer science faculty at several other universities, including Tufts University, the University of Southern California, Florida International University, and the Georgia Institute of Technology (Georgia Tech), prior to joining the MIT faculty in 1982. Since then, she has been working on applying mathematics to the tasks of understanding and constructing complex distributed systems.

Her 1985 work with Michael J. Fischer and Mike Paterson on consensus problems received the PODC Influential-Paper Award in 2001. Their work showed that in an asynchronous distributed system, consensus is impossible if there is one processor that crashes. On their contribution, Jennifer Welch wrote that "this result has had a monumental impact in distributed computing, both theory and practice. Systems designers were motivated to clarify their claims concerning under what circumstances the systems work."

She is the author of numerous research articles about distributed algorithms and impossibility results, and about formal modeling and validation of distributed systems (see, e.g., input/output automaton). She is the author of the graduate textbook "Distributed Algorithms". She is a member of the National Academy of Sciences, the National Academy of Engineering, and an ACM Fellow.

Recognition
1997: ACM Fellow
2001: Dijkstra Paper Prize of PODC conference
2001: Elected a member of the National Academy of Engineering for the development of theoretical foundations for distributed computing.
2006: Van Wijngaarden Award
2007: Knuth Prize
2007: Dijkstra Paper Prize of PODC conference
2010: IEEE Emanuel R. Piore Award
2012: Athena Lecturer
2015: National Academy of Sciences

Bibliography

References

External links
Nancy Lynch's home page at MIT

 A series of invited lectures at PODC 2008 and CONCUR 2008.

American computer scientists
1948 births
Living people
Researchers in distributed computing
MIT School of Engineering faculty
Georgia Tech faculty
Fellows of the Association for Computing Machinery
American women computer scientists
Knuth Prize laureates
Dijkstra Prize laureates
Members of the United States National Academy of Engineering
Massachusetts Institute of Technology alumni
Brooklyn College alumni
Theoretical computer scientists
20th-century American scientists
21st-century American scientists
Members of the United States National Academy of Sciences
21st-century American women